Kentucky Colonel is the highest title of honor bestowed by the Commonwealth of Kentucky.

Kentucky Colonel, Kentucky Colonels, or Kentucky Colonelcy  may also refer to:

Related to the title
 , charitable or fraternal societies based on the honorable title
 Honorable Order of Kentucky Colonels or simply "Kentucky Colonels", the largest of the Kentucky colonel organizations
 Kentucky colonelcy, refers to the actual duty and obligations of a commission
 Kentucky Colonelcy, a website dedicated to Kentucky colonels and their history; see

Other common uses
 "A Kentucky Colonel", an 1890 novel by Opie Read
 The Kentucky Colonel, a 1920's silent film based on the book
 Eastern Kentucky Colonels, the college athletic teams of Eastern Kentucky University
Eastern Kentucky Colonels men's basketball
Eastern Kentucky Colonels football
Eastern Kentucky Colonels women's basketball
Kentucky Colonels, an American basketball team from 1967 to 1976
 Kentucky Colonels (ABA 2000), an American basketball team from 2004 to 2006
 Kentucky Colonels (band), a Bluegrass music group

See also
Colonel (disambiguation)
Louisville Colonels (disambiguation)
The Colonel (disambiguation)